The Canadian Bank Note Company (CBNC) is a Canadian security printing company. It is best known for holding the contract with the Bank of Canada to supply it with Canada's banknotes since 1935. The company's other clients include private businesses, national and sub-national governments, central banks, and postal services from around the world.  In addition to banknotes, the company produces passports, driver's licences, birth certificates, postage stamps, coupons, and many other security-conscious document-related products.  It also prints and provides document reading systems for identification cards, lottery tickets, stamps, and banknotes.

From 1897 until 1923, CBN was a unit of the New York-based American Bank Note Company (now known as ABCorp). It was later a privately held company when it was acquired by Ottawa businessman Charles Worthen; beginning in 1976 Douglas Arends slowly acquired control of the company.  It has since been based in Ottawa, Ontario.  In October 2006, RR Donnelley completed the acquisition of Canadian Bank Note's financial printing business, consisting of documentation for initial public offerings.

Since 2014, the Canadian Bank Note Company has been the chief provider for machine-readable passports used within the Caribbean Community bloc of countries. The majority of the new CARICOM passports as they are called serve the union as a centerpiece of promoting easy travel within the Caribbean Single Market and Economy (CSME).

Gallery
Samples of items printed by Canadian Bank Note Company:

See also

Canadian dollar
Cash
Bank of Canada
Royal Canadian Mint

References

External links
Canadian Bank Note Company

Bank Note Company
Bank Note Company
Companies based in Ottawa
Financial services companies established in 1897
Manufacturing companies established in 1897
Publishing companies established in 1897
Banknote printing companies
1897 establishments in Ontario
Canadian companies established in 1897